FC Attila Ungheni was a Moldovan football club based in Ungheni, Moldova. They played one season in the Moldovan National Division, the first tier of Moldovan football.

History
The club was founded in 1954 as Lokomotiv Ungheni. The same year it won the Moldavian SSR Football Cup. It was renamed to Delia Ungheni in 1992 and to Attila Ungheni in 1995. In 1996, the club was promoted to the Moldovan first tier. In 1997, it suffered relegation and was dissolved.

References

Football clubs in the Moldavian Soviet Socialist Republic
Defunct football clubs in Moldova
Association football clubs established in 1954
Association football clubs disestablished in 1997
1954 establishments in the Soviet Union
1997 disestablishments in Moldova